Opinan is a fishing village on the west coast of Scotland in Gairloch, Ross-shire,  Scottish Highlands and is in the Scottish council area of Highland.

The village of Port Henderson lies directly to the north.

References

Populated places in Ross and Cromarty